This article lists the top all-time goalscorer for each men's national football team. This list is  an all-time top international goalscorers list, as several countries have two or more players with more goals than another country's top scorer. It simply lists only .

List of top scorers
Players in bold are still active at international level.
Players in italics also hold the record for most caps for their nation.
Rank is a count of nations. Eighteen nations (Brazil, Bulgaria, Curaçao, Denmark, England, Eswatini, Faroe Islands, Gibraltar, Iceland, Lebanon, Mongolia, Namibia, Nepal, Palestine, Romania, Scotland, United States and U.S. Virgin Islands) have a pair of players tied for national leader. Anguilla and Eritrea have three players tied as their leading scorer. These are all counted as one nation each.

List of non-FIFA top scorers

These are the top scorers for nations that do not have FIFA membership, but are associate members of one of FIFA's affiliated confederations. 

Players in bold are still active at international level.
Players in italics also hold the record for most caps for their nation.

List of top scorers from defunct nations

These are the top scorers for defunct nations that do not have a FIFA recognised successor team. 

Players in italics also hold the record for most caps for their nation.

Notes

See also
List of women's footballers with 100 or more international goals
List of women's footballers with 100 or more international caps
List of men's footballers with 100 or more international caps
List of men's footballers with 50 or more international goals
List of men's footballers with the most official appearances
List of men's footballers with 500 or more goals
List of one-club men in association football
List of association football competitions
List of goalscoring goalkeepers

References
General
Roberto Mamrud, Karel Stokkermans. "Players with 100+ Caps and 30+ International Goals". RSSSF. Retrieved 15 January 2016.

Specific

External links

RSSSF
More goals than caps. FIFA. 3 June 2009
Europe's all-time top international goalscorers UEFA. 8 November 2011
Top 10 premier league goals. 30 December 2017

international
Men's top scorers